Dr. John Augustus Abayomi-Cole (1848–1943) was a Sierra Leonean medical doctor and herbalist.

Early life and education
Abayomi-Cole was born in 1848 in Abeokuta, Ogun State in southwest Nigeria to Creole parents from Sierra Leone who were living in Nigeria as missionaries.  When they returned to Freetown, they  brought the four-year-old Abayomi-Cole with them. In Freetown he was put under the tutelage of  A. B. C. Sibthorpe at Hastings, a suburb of Freetown and was later sent to the C.M.S. while in Freetown, he  attended the Grammar School where he completed his secondary education. He received a bachelor's degree in Medicine from the Fourah Bay College in Freetown.

After graduating , he taught at the Evangelical United Brethren Church School, and in his mid-twenties he moved to the United States, where he was ordained a Minister in the American Wesleyan Methodist church. He attended their General Conference in 1887, where he pleaded for missionaries to be sent to Sierra Leone. This led to a small mission led by Rev. Henry Johnston being dispatched there in 1889.

Medical doctor
He later qualified as a medical doctor and became a Fellow of the Society of Apothecaries (F.S.A.) of the United States. Shortly thereafter, he became an affiliate of the National Association of Medical Herbalists in the United Kingdom.

Combining his scientific training with a wealth of knowledge on the healing properties of traditional herbs, roots and leaves, His fame soon spread to all parts of Sierra Leone, and even to neighbouring Liberia. His cures were a mixture of the orthodox and the traditional. He treated rheumatic pains, skin diseases such as "alay", nervous and eye diseases, etc. During the 1918 flu pandemic, he invented a preparation of "tea-bush", "camphor", lime and spirit which saved many lives at a time when the influenza death toll was so high that people were buried in trenches in Freetown and other areas in Sierra Leone. One of his well-known preparations as an antidote for poison, "ekpa", is still used in Krio villages homes in the Western Area. It is also used as a remedy for various stomach disorders.

Abayomi-Cole's herbal practice became   popular,  and he became a scientific and medical adviser to Governor Sir Leslie Probyn. 

At the turn of the century, malaria was the greatest scourge of West Africa, and was taking a deadly toll particularly of Europeans living in West Africa. Dr. Abayomi-Cole was called upon by the Colonial Government to help combat the disease. He made an effective preparation of herbs, containing as its main ingredients "broomstone" leaves and "agiri".  But he found that his cured patients returned within a few weeks with the same symptoms. Through intensive  research, he was able to establish that poor environmental sanitation was the root cause of the relapse — mosquitoes were breeding in stagnant pools of water around houses. He organised groups of voluntary workers known as "mosquito missionaries" who went from compound to compound advising people on the necessity of keeping their living areas clean. The scheme worked so well that the Colonial Government later paid the volunteers monthly.

Death
John Augustus Abayomi-Cole died in 1943 at the age of 92.

Works
 The Hope of Sherbro's Future Greatness: A Lecture Delivered at Shaingay (1885) Dayton, Ohio: United Brethren Publishing House
 Revelation of the Secret Orders of Western Africa: Including an Explanation of the Beliefs and Customs of African Heathenism (1886) Dayton, Ohio: United Brethren Publishing House

References

 

Sierra Leone Creole people
1943 deaths
1848 births